Stephen Fry in America is a six-part BBC television series in which Stephen Fry travels across the United States. In the six-part series he travels, mostly in a London cab, through all 50 of the U.S. state and Washington, D.C..

The episodes are regularly repeated in the UK on Dave. It was aired in the United States on HDNet. In Australia, the program screened on ABC1. The ratings were so successful that the broadcaster decided to finally air Fry's other BBC programme, QI the next month.

The series was filmed in two segments, the first in October–November 2007, and the second in February–April 2008. Special guests featured on the show include Sting, Jimmy Wales, Morgan Freeman, Buddy Guy, and Ted Turner.

Episode list

Home media releases
The UK home video version was released by West Park Pictures through Lace Digital Media Sales on 17 November 2008. Both the DVD and Blu-ray versions are two-disc sets, complete and uncut. A two-disc Region 1 version was released in the United States in July 2010. In Australia, it was released by Madman Entertainment on two-disc DVD and Blu-ray on 19 August 2009.

Book
A book to accompany the series, also called Stephen Fry in America, was published by HarperCollins in 2008. In it Stephen writes in more detail about some of his adventures, as well as some of the ones not featured in the show.

Announced follow-up
In May 2008, it was announced that a five-part companion series, More Fry in America, had been commissioned for BBC Four. It was to feature in-depth essays excluded from the first series due to time constraints. No further information about the project has since been released.

Sequel
A four-part sequel series, Stephen Fry in Central America, was broadcast on ITV in the UK from 27 August to 17 September 2015, following Fry travelling through Mexico and the countries of Central America.

References

External links

2008 Fry Podcast mentioning the series

2000s British travel television series
2008 British television series debuts
2008 British television series endings
BBC high definition shows
BBC television documentaries
Stephen Fry
British travel television series
Television series about countries
English-language television shows